Jorge Rojo García de Alba (born 24 June 1963) is a Mexican politician from the Institutional Revolutionary Party. From 2009 to 2012 he served as Deputy of the LXI Legislature of the Mexican Congress representing Hidalgo.

References

1951 births
Living people
Politicians from Hidalgo (state)
Institutional Revolutionary Party politicians
21st-century Mexican politicians
National Autonomous University of Mexico alumni
Universidad Anáhuac México alumni
Deputies of the LXI Legislature of Mexico
Members of the Chamber of Deputies (Mexico) for Hidalgo (state)